Topopyrone C and its analogs are fungal isolates with anticancer activity in vitro.

Notes 

Triols
Triketones
Resorcinols
Oxygen heterocycles
Heterocyclic compounds with 4 rings